The Christian Examiner was an American periodical published between 1813 and 1869.

History and profile
Founded in 1813 as The Christian Disciple, it was purchased in 1814 by Nathan Hale. His son Edward Everett Hale later oversaw publication. Ralph Waldo Emerson's first printed work, "Thoughts on the Religion of the Middle Ages," signed "H.O.N.," was published in The Christian Disciple in 1822.

Through the years, editors included: William Ellery Channing; Noah Worcester; Henry Ware Jr.; John Gorham Palfrey; Francis Jenks, and others. An important journal of liberal Christianity, it was influential in the Unitarian and Transcendentalist movements. It ceased publication in 1869 when it was subsumed by a new Unitarian periodical edited by Edward Everett Hale and called Old and New.

References

Further reading
  The Christian Disciple and Theological Review. v.1
 v.4 The Christian Disciple and Theological Review. (1816).
   The Christian Disciple and Theological Review v.1 (1819);  
 v.4 The Christian Disciple and Theological Review, new series. (1822).
 v.1 (1824 The Christian Examiner)
 v.2  The Christian Examiner
 v.4 The Christian Examiner (1825) .
 The Christian Examiner series  Archive.org

Religious magazines published in the United States
Christian magazines
Defunct magazines published in the United States
Magazines established in 1813
Magazines disestablished in 1844
Magazines published in Boston